Nordihydroguaiaretic acid, informally abbreviated NDGA in research articles, is a classic lignan, a phenylpropane dimer linked by a bond between positions C8 and C8′, as opposed to a neolignan. It is a natural compound found in the creosote bush (Larrea tridentata).

Medical properties 
As a lignan, it is a member of one of the major classes of phytoestrogens. While it is commonly asserted that the biological properties of lignans per sé are void, and that only the enterolignans enterodiol and enterolactone, produced from lignans by intestinal bacteria have interesting biological properties, nordihydroguaiaretic acid has antioxidant and anti-inflammatory properties in vitro or in animal models. It is a redox-type inhibitor of 5-lipoxygenase.

A 1986 study involved feeding female mosquitos NDGA to test the effect on their average life span. While the usual mosquito life span was 29 days, the NDGA-fed mosquitos lived an average of 45 days—an increase of 50 percent.  A 2008 study reported that nordihydroguaiaretic acid lengthened the lifespan of male mice, but not of female mice.

The creosote plant has been used in herbal medicine, but its use is controversial.  It was widely used during the 1950s as a food preservative and to preserve natural fibers, but was later banned after reports of toxicity during the early 1960s.  Recently, it has been used as a nutritional supplement; however, renal toxicity and hepatotoxicity are reported for chronic use of creosote bush and NDGA.

See also 
 Masoprocol, an antineoplastic drug used to treat skin growths caused by sun exposure.

References

Phenol antioxidants
Phenylpropanoids
Plant toxins